Canadian Pacific Air Lines, also known as CP Air, served the following destinations prior to merging with Canadian Airlines and ceasing operations in 1987:

Americas 
 
 Buenos Aires - Ministro Pistarini International Airport
 
 Rio de Janeiro - Rio de Janeiro-Galeão International Airport
 São Paulo - São Paulo-Guarulhos International Airport
 
 Baie-Comeau - Baie-Comeau Airport
 Calgary - Calgary International Airport
 Edmonton - Edmonton International Airport
 Fort Nelson - Northern Rockies Regional Airport
 Fort St. John - North Peace Airport
 Grande Prairie - Grande Prairie Airport
 Halifax - Halifax Stanfield International Airport
 Montreal - Montréal–Mirabel International Airport
 Ottawa - Ottawa Macdonald–Cartier International Airport
 Prince George - Prince George Airport
 Prince Rupert - Prince Rupert Airport
 Quebec City - Jean Lesage International Airport
 Terrace - Northwest Regional Airport
 Toronto - Toronto Pearson International Airport
 Vancouver - Vancouver International Airport
 Victoria - Victoria International Airport
 Watson Lake - Watson Lake Airport
 Whitehorse - Erik Nielsen Whitehorse International Airport
 Winnipeg - Winnipeg James Armstrong Richardson International Airport
 Yellowknife - Yellowknife Airport
 
 Santiago de Chile - Arturo Merino Benítez International Airport
 
 Acapulco - General Juan N. Álvarez International Airport
 Guadalajara - Miguel Hidalgo y Costilla International Airport
 Mexico City - Lic. Benito Juarez International Airport
 Monterrey - General Mariano Escobedo International Airport
 
 Lima - Jorge Chávez International Airport
 
 Chicago - Chicago Midway International Airport
 Honolulu - Honolulu International Airport
 Los Angeles - Los Angeles International Airport
 San Francisco - San Francisco International Airport

Asia 
 
 Hong Kong - Kai Tak Airport
 
 Beijing - Beijing Capital International Airport
 Shanghai - Shanghai Hongqiao International Airport
 
 Tel Aviv - Ben Gurion Airport
 
 Tokyo - Haneda Airport
 
 Karachi - Jinnah International Airport
 
 Bangkok - Don Mueang International Airport

Europe 
 
 Athens - Ellinikon International Airport
 
 Milan - Milan Malpensa Airport
 Rome - Leonardo da Vinci–Fiumicino Airport
 
 Amsterdam - Amsterdam Airport Schiphol
 
 Lisbon - Lisbon Airport
 Santa Maria - Santa Maria Airport
 
 Madrid - Adolfo Suárez Madrid–Barajas Airport

Oceania 
 
 Sydney - Sydney Airport
 
 Nadi - Nadi International Airport
 
 Auckland  - Auckland Airport

References

Canadian Pacific Air Lines
Canadian Pacific Air Lines